The Cochecho River (incorrectly Cocheco River) is a tributary of the Piscataqua River,  long, in the U.S. state of New Hampshire. It rises in northern Strafford County and runs southeastward, through the town of Farmington and the cities of Rochester and Dover, where it provides hydroelectric power. Below the center of Dover, the river is tidal and joins the Salmon Falls River at the Maine border to form the Piscataqua. Significant tributaries include the Ela River, the Mad River, and the Isinglass River.

History of the name
Cochecho is an Abenaki word meaning "rapid foaming water," referring to Cochecho Falls in downtown Dover. Settlers adopted the name for both the river and their principal settlement, Cochecho village.

In 1642, Richard Waldron was granted water privileges at Cochecho Falls, moving there from Dover Point to build a sawmill and gristmill. During the Industrial Revolution, these industries would be supplanted by cotton textile mills. In 1827, the Cocheco Manufacturing Company was founded, and its brick buildings would come to dominate the riverfront. But as 19th-century historian Caroline Harwood Garland writes, "By an error of the engrossing clerk in the act of incorporation, the old Indian word, Cochecho, became Cocheco."

Another early historian, Alonzo Hall Quint, laments the error: "The chief fault of the present Company is their barbarous spelling of 'Cocheco' instead of 'Cochecho,' for which no possible excuse exists." In an 1851 essay written for the Dover Enquirer, Quint records the history of the Cochecho River's name:

It has been ill-treated in a most serious manner. Every person seems to have felt himself authorized to manage its orthography in any way he chose; hence all sorts of ways of spelling it have prevailed.

The first record in which we meet the name is in 1642, and in that the name is spelt CUTTCHECHOE, the pronunciation of which is evident. In 1648 it is spelt COCHCHECHOE and is so pronounced for many years. In 1650 COCHECHAE is met with for once, and the pronunciation of this manner of spelling was that usually followed about 1670. In later times the pronunciation of the last syllable had reverted to the original form, that of the first and second remaining as it was so that Cochecho became the name; this is seen to be almost the exact original pronunciation and has been well settled for years. The spelling KECHEACHY was used occasionally a few years after 1700, but it never came into general use. The form QUOCHECHO is a unmitigated barbarism, so is COCHECO, although its unfortunate adoption by the Manufacturing Company of this place has given some credit to that form. The form Cochecho is best supported by old examples and is at present generally adopted by all who know anything of its origin."

In 1909, Pacific Mills of Lawrence, Massachusetts bought the Cocheco Manufacturing Company and set about making changes, one of which was to end the disparity between the river's historic spelling and the mill's 1827 error. Instead of correcting the mill's spelling, it petitioned the United States Board on Geographic Names to drop Cochecho and adopt Cocheco. It complied, a federal agency bowing to a commercial enterprise, beginning more than a century of confusion about the name, a common Dover brand then and now. In 1937, the Cocheco Manufacturing Company succumbed to the Great Depression and went out of business. All that remains of the business are its repurposed buildings, listed on the National Register of Historic Places, and contentious spelling.

In 2015, the United States Board on Geographic Names received a formal proposal to correct the spelling of the name from Cocheco to Cochecho, reversing the board's 1911 decision. The petition was supported by the Dover mayor, Dover City Council, the NH Department of Cultural Resources (which includes the Division of Historical Resources), and the Department of Resources and Economic Development.  It also garnered support from the Dover Chamber of Commerce, which runs the Cochecho Arts Festival and promotes the Cochecho Waterfront Development.

In its deliberation, the US BGN sought the opinion of the State of New Hampshire. On September 15, 2015, it was answered by the State Names Coordinator of the NH State Names Authority, who recommended that the US BGN decline correction.  But New Hampshire has no State Names Coordinator or NH State Names Authority -- both are fictions invented by a NH state bureaucrat whose real job is providing census data to planning boards. The US BGN took him at his word, however, and declined the petition. As a result, the contradictory spelling was sustained, with signs on Dover bridges identifying the stream as the Cochecho River, that on the Spaulding Turnpike as the Cocheco River. But now that it is known the US BGN was misled, a review of the 2015 petition, or consideration of another one, is possible. If the New Hampshire Council on Resources and Development (CORD), a conference of state bureaucracies, votes to correct, and the US BGN agrees, the confusion over Dover's aboriginal name would finally end.

See also

List of rivers of New Hampshire

References

Rivers of New Hampshire
Rivers of Strafford County, New Hampshire
New Hampshire placenames of Native American origin